China first competed at the 1958 World Championships.  They stopped competing after the 1962 World Championships due to the International Gymnastics Federation accepting Taiwan as a member nation.  They returned in 1979 where Ma Yanhong won China's first gold medal.  The Chinese women originally won the bronze medal in the team event at the 1999 World Championships; however their medal was stripped in 2010 after it was discovered that Dong Fangxiao's age was falsified at the time of the competition.

Medalists

Medal tables

By gender

By event

Junior World medalists

See also 
 China women's national artistic gymnastics team
 List of Olympic female artistic gymnasts for China

References 

World Artistic Gymnastics Championships
Gymnastics in China